Bikur Cholim B'nai Israel Synagogue is an historic synagogue in Swan Lake, Sullivan County, New York.  It was built about 1926 and is a small, -story wood-frame building with a stucco finish.

It was added to the National Register of Historic Places in 1999.

It is currently used annually three days a year for Holiday Services on Rosh Hashanah and Yom Kippur.

References

Synagogues in Sullivan County, New York
National Register of Historic Places in Sullivan County, New York
Synagogues on the National Register of Historic Places in New York (state)
Synagogues completed in 1926
1926 establishments in New York (state)